Stéphane Demers (born 1966) is a Canadian actor best known for having portrayed Canadian Prime Minister Pierre Trudeau in the television mini-series Trudeau II: Maverick in the Making. He also appeared in the television series Trauma, Sophie and Les Hauts et les bas de Sophie Paquin, and in the films The Left-Hand Side of the Fridge (La Moitié gauche du frigo), The Orphan Muses (Les Muses orphelines) and Maman Last Call.

Demers was born in Montreal, Quebec.

Recognition 
 2000 Gémeaux Award for Best Supporting Actor - Series or Dramatic Program - Fortier (episode 1.9) - Nominated

Filmography

References

External links 
 
 Stéphane Demers at NorthernStars.ca

1966 births
Living people
Canadian male film actors
Canadian male television actors
Male actors from Montreal